Shao Mingli (born October 1951) is the current head of the Chinese State Food and Drug Administration. He took over from Zheng Xiaoyu after his removal and execution in 2007.

External links
Biography of Shao Mingli, official website of the State Food and Drug Administration

1951 births
People's Republic of China politicians from Shandong
Living people
Politicians from Jinan
Date of birth missing (living people)